The 1987 Men's African Volleyball Championship was in Tunis, Tunisia, with 8 teams participating in the continental championship.

Teams

Competition

Final

Final ranking

References
 Men Volleyball Africa Championship 1987 Tunis (TUN)

1987 Men
African championship, Men
Men's African Volleyball Championship
1987 in Tunisian sport
International volleyball competitions hosted by Tunisia